James Squire Farnell (25 June 1825 – 21 August 1888) was an Australian politician and Premier of New South Wales. Farnell was a hard-working legislator who gave much study to the land question and also tried hard for some years to pass a bill for the regulation of contagious diseases.

Early years
Farnell was born in St Leonards, New South Wales, son of Thomas Charles Farnell, a brewer, and Mary Ann Farnell, daughter of James Squire, an English Romanichal, who arrived on the First Fleet and may have been Australia's first brewer. He was educated at Parramatta. At a comparatively early age he began travelling with stock and learnt much about his own colony. The California Gold Rush in 1849 led to his visiting America, and he also travelled in New Zealand before finally returning to New South Wales.

Political career
In 1860, Farnell won the by-election for the Legislative Assembly seat of St Leonards, but was defeated at the next election for the seat of Central Cumberland. He was returned at Parramatta in 1864 and held the seat for 10 years. He became Secretary for Lands in the first Parkes ministry from May 1872 to February 1875, and for a short period was also Secretary for Mines. He was defeated for 1874 election for Parramatta, but was returned to parliament election for St Leonards held 11 days later, serving until 1882.

From December 1876 until October 1877, Farnell was the chairman of committees, but towards the end of that year he organized a "Third Party", in November carried an amendment to the address in reply by two votes, and the Robertson ministry resigned.

Premier

Farnell succeeded in forming a ministry and on 18 December 1877 and took office as the first Australian-born Premier, choosing the portfolio of Secretary for Lands. In October 1878 he brought in a land bill which was defeated on 5 December. Farnell resigned and was succeeded by the third Parkes ministry.

Subsequent career
Farnell was unsuccessful in his candidacy for Parramatta at the 1882 election, but was returned to parliament at the election for New England held 2 weeks later. From 1882 to 1885, he represented New England. When the Stuart ministry was formed in January 1883, Farnell was again Secretary for Lands, and showed much patience and tact in his management of the land bill which became law in 1884. In the succeeding Dibbs ministry formed in October 1885 he was Minister of Justice and representative of the ministry in the Representative of the Government in the Legislative Council, having been appointed to the Legislative Council on the same day, but resigned from the ministry 2 days later. In 1887, he resigned from the Legislative Council to successfully contest Redfern as a Free Trade candidate at the election on 5 February and represented that constituency until his death.

He died in Petersham. His wife survived him with 11 children, one of whom, Frank Farnell, was a member of the Legislative Assembly for Central Cumberland at the time of his father's death and later Ryde.

Honours
Farnell declined a knighthood.

Farnell was Grand Master of the Grand Lodge of New South Wales, installed on 3 December 1877.

References

 

1825 births
1888 deaths
Australian people of English descent
Premiers of New South Wales
Colonial Secretaries of New South Wales
Members of the New South Wales Legislative Assembly
Australian people of Romani descent
19th-century Australian politicians